Lorenzo Capicchioni (born 19 January 2002) is a Sammarinese footballer who plays as a midfielder for United Riccione and the San Marino national team.

Career
Capicchioni made his international debut for San Marino on 17 November 2022 in a friendly match against Saint Lucia, which finished as a 1–1 away draw.

Career statistics

International

References

2002 births
Living people
Sammarinese footballers
San Marino youth international footballers
San Marino under-21 international footballers
San Marino international footballers
Association football midfielders